Liang Yanshun (born December 1962) is a Chinese politician and the current Communist Party Secretary of Ningxia, in office since March 2022.

Early life and education
Liang was born in Tai'an, Shandong, in December 1962. After resuming the college entrance examination in 1979, he was accepted to Shandong Institute of Agricultural Mechanization (now Shandong University of Technology), majoring in agricultural mechanization. After graduating in 1983, he stayed and worked at the university. In 1989, he entered Liaoning University, earning a master's in economics in 1992.

Career
Liang joined the Chinese Communist Party (CCP) in February 1985, and began his political career in the Central Party School of the Chinese Communist Party in July 1992.

In January 2016, he was appointed head of the Publicity Department of CCP Gansu Provincial Committee and was admitted to member of the standing committee of the CCP Gansu Provincial Committee, the province's top authority. One year later, he became head of the Organization Department of CCP Gansu Provincial Committee, but having held the position for only ten months.

In December 2017, he was made deputy secretary of the CCP Central Committee , and held that office until July 2018, when he was named head of the Publicity Department of the Chinese Communist Party. In October 2020, he was recalled to the State Organs Work Committee of CCCPC and appointed executive deputy secretary.

On 28 March 2022, he was transferred to northwest China's Ningxia and was promoted to party secretary, the top political position in the region.

References

1962 births
Living people
People from Tai'an
Shandong University of Technology alumni
Liaoning University alumni
Central Party School of the Chinese Communist Party alumni
People's Republic of China politicians from Shandong
Chinese Communist Party politicians from Shandong